Norbury is a civil parish in Shropshire, England.  It contains eleven listed buildings that are recorded in the National Heritage List for England.  Of these, two are at Grade II*, the middle of the three grades, and the others are at Grade II, the lowest grade.  The parish contains the village of Norbury and the surrounding countryside.  The oldest of the listed buildings are a church and a manor house.  Most of the other listed buildings are cottages, and the rest consist of a farmhouse and farm buildings, and two milestones.
 

Key

Buildings

References

Citations

Sources

Lists of buildings and structures in Shropshire